Nemich is a surname. Notable people with the surname are:

Alexandra Nemich (born 1995), Kazakhstani synchronized swimmer and sister of Yekaterina Nemich
Yekaterina Nemich (born 1995), Kazakhstani synchronized swimmer and sister of Alexandra Nemich